WOH G64 (IRAS 04553-6825) is an unusual red supergiant (RSG) star in the Large Magellanic Cloud (LMC) satellite galaxy in the southern constellation of Dorado. It is one of the largest known stars, being described as possibly being the largest star known. It is also one of the most luminous and massive red supergiants, with a radius calculated to be around 1,540 times that of the Sun and a luminosity around 282,000 times the solar luminosity.

WOH G64 is surrounded by an optically thick dust envelope of roughly a light year in diameter containing 3 to 9 times the Sun's mass of expelled material that was created by the strong stellar wind. If placed at the center of the Solar System, the star's photosphere would engulf the orbit of Jupiter.

Discovery
WOH G64 was discovered in the 1970s by Bengt Westerlund, Olander and Hedin. Like NML Cygni, the "WOH" in the star's name comes from the names of its three discoverers, but in this case refers to a whole catalogue of giant and supergiant stars in the LMC.  Westerlund also discovered another notable red supergiant star, Westerlund 1-26, found in the massive super star cluster Westerlund 1 in the constellation Ara.  In 1986, infrared observations showed that it was a highly luminous supergiant surrounded by gas and dust which absorbed around three quarters of its radiation.

In 2007, observers using the Very Large Telescope (VLT) showed that WOH G64 is surrounded by a torus-shaped cloud.

Distance

Variability
WOH G64 varies regularly in brightness by over a magnitude at visual wavelengths with a primary period of around 800 days. The star suffers from over six magnitudes of extinction at visual wavelengths, and the variation at infra-red wavelengths is much smaller. It has been described as a carbon-rich Mira or long-period variable, which would necessarily be an asymptotic-giant-branch star (AGB star) rather than a supergiant.  Brightness variability has been confirmed by other researchers in some spectral bands, but it is unclear what the actual variable type is.  No significant spectral variation has been found.

Physical properties

The spectral type of WOH G64 is given as M5, but it is usually found to have a much cooler spectral type of M7.5, highly unusual for a supergiant star.

WOH G64 is classified as an extremely luminous M class supergiant and is likely to be the largest star and the most luminous and coolest red supergiant in the LMC. The combination of the star's temperature and luminosity places it toward the upper right corner of the Hertzsprung–Russell diagram. The star's evolved state means that it can no longer hold on to its atmosphere due to low density, high radiation pressure, and the relatively opaque products of thermonuclear fusion.

The parameters of WOH G64 are uncertain.

Those physical parameters are consistent with the largest galactic red supergiants and hypergiants found elsewhere such as Westerlund 1-26, VY Canis Majoris and NML Cygni and with theoretical models of the coolest, most luminous and largest possible cool supergiants (e.g. the Hayashi limit or the Humphreys–Davidson limit).

Spectral features
WOH G64 was discovered to be a prominent source of OH, and  masers emission, which is typical of an OH/IR supergiant star. It shows an unusual spectrum of nebular emission; the hot gas is rich in nitrogen and has a radial velocity considerably more positive than that of the star. The stellar atmosphere is producing a strong silicate absorption band in mid-infrared wavelengths, accompanied a line emission due to highly excited carbon monoxide.

Possible companion

See also 
 WOH S281
 WOH G17
 HV 888

Notes

References

Stars in the Large Magellanic Cloud
M-type supergiants
Large Magellanic Cloud
Extragalactic stars
J04551048-6820298
Dorado (constellation)
IRAS catalogue objects
Emission-line stars
TIC objects